Leslie Wilcox (1865 – after 1889) was an English footballer who played in the Football Alliance for Small Heath. Born in West Bromwich, Staffordshire, Wilcox played for local club West Bromwich Highfield before joining Small Heath in 1889. An outside left, he scored on his debut in February 1890, and again in the second of his four games for the club, but nothing is known of his activities after the 1889–90 football season.

References

1865 births
Year of death missing
Sportspeople from West Bromwich
English footballers
Association football outside forwards
Birmingham City F.C. players
Football Alliance players
Date of birth missing
Place of death missing